Michel Rousseau is the name of:
 Michel Rousseau (cyclist) (1936–2016), French cyclist
 Michel Rousseau (swimmer) (born 1949), French former swimmer

See also 
 Rousseau (surname)